JJ Weeks Band is an American contemporary Christian music band from Macon, Georgia that began in 2001. The band is composed of lead vocalist and acoustic guitarist Jason Clint "JJ" Weeks, drummer Jon Poole, bass guitarist David Hart, and guitarist Cody Preston. Their 2013 release, All Over the World, with Inpop Records, saw several songs chart on various Christian Songs charts published by Billboard magazine, including: "Let Them See You," "What Kind of Love," and "Do Not Be Afraid." They are currently signed to Centricity Music where they released their most recent studio album, As Long as We Can Breathe in April 2016.

Background
The contemporary Christian music and band formed in Macon, Georgia, in 2001. They count as their members; lead vocalist and acoustic guitarist, Jason Clint "JJ" Weeks, drummer, Jon Poole, bass guitarist, David Hart, and guitarist, Cody Preston. Their former guitarist was Garrett Lee.

Music history
The group formed in 2001, yet their first major label released studio album wasn't released until 2013, All Over the World, by Inpop Records on March 26, 2013. The song, "Let Them See You", charted on the Billboard magazine Christian Songs chart at No. 9, while it placed at No. 7 on the Christian Airplay chart. Another self-released song, "Do Not Be Afraid", charted on the Billboard magazine Christian Songs chart at No. 40, while it placed at No. 24 on the Christian Airplay chart. Their first single to chart upon the Billboard magazine charts was "What Kind of Love", and this peaked at No. 8 on the Christian Soft AC chart. The band signed a recording deal with Centricity Music, where they released a new studio album from the band, As Long as We Can Breathe, on April 8, 2016.

Members
Current members
 Jason Clint "JJ" Weeks (born May 10, 1978) – Vocals
Former members
 Garrett Lee (born June 29) – Guitar
 Robbie Fritz (born January 23) – Drums
 Jon Poole (born December 5) – Drums
 David Hart (born February 21) – Bass
 Cody Preston (born July 19) – Guitar
 Austin Abbott - Guitar
 Justin Lairsey - Drums
 Jordan Welsh - Keyboard, Guitar

Discography
Studio albums

'EPs
 Day EP (January 12, 2009, Independent)
 Live Acoustic EP (2012, Independent)
 Hallelujah EP (2015, Independent)

References

External links
 Official website

Musical groups established in 2001
Musical groups from Georgia (U.S. state)
Centricity Music artists
Inpop Records artists